The  (Asian Highway Network ) is a suspension bridge crossing the Kanmon Straits, a stretch of water separating two of Japan's four main islands. On the Honshū side of the bridge is Shimonoseki (which contributed Kan to the name of the strait) and on the Kyūshū side is Kitakyushu, whose former city and present ward, Moji, gave the strait its mon.

The Kanmon Bridge was opened to vehicles on November 14, 1973 and connected to the Kyūshū Expressway on March 27, 1984.

See also 
 Kanmon Tunnel

External links 
 

Suspension bridges in Japan
Bridges completed in 1973
AH1
Road transport in Japan